María del Carmen García de la Cadena Romero (born 31 October 1968) is a Mexican politician affiliated with the PRI. She currently serves as Deputy of the LXII Legislature of the Mexican Congress representing Puebla.

As a Federal Deputy with a history of supporting public institutions, Maricarmen promoted well-being, development and security. She succeeded in partnering with and influencing government and business leaders to identify and prioritize key party initiatives.

Some of her achievements include participation in the ordinary commissions of Foreign Relations, Public Security and Housing where agreements were developed for the fight against domestic violence, the rights of young people and protection of children against sexual exploitation and abuse, all of this was achieved through arduous planning and negotiation.

Participation and memberships

·Secretariat of the Ordinary Commission on Foreign Relations

·Secretariat of the Ordinary Public Security Commission

·Member of the Ordinary Housing Commission

·Member of the Monitoring Commission for the Evaluations of the Concurrent Special Program

·Member of the Evaluation Committee of the Child Development Center "CENDI"

·Member of the Management and Complaints Committee

·Vice Coordinator in Social Management

References

1968 births
Living people
Politicians from Puebla
Women members of the Chamber of Deputies (Mexico)
Institutional Revolutionary Party politicians
21st-century Mexican politicians
21st-century Mexican women politicians
People from Tehuacán
Members of the Chamber of Deputies (Mexico) for Puebla